Parkway Center Mall was an enclosed shopping mall in Pittsburgh, Pennsylvania. Opened in 1982, the mall closed in 2013 after losing Kmart, its last anchor store. The only remaining store in operation is a Giant Eagle supermarket. In 2016, the entirety of the mall was demolished, except for the Giant Eagle building with the vacant former Kmart space above it.

History
Kossman Development opened Parkway Center Mall on November 4, 1982. Original anchor stores included Gold Circle, Giant Eagle, Zayre, Thrift Drug, and a David Weis catalog showroom. Other major tenants included Chi-Chi's, K·B Toys, RadioShack, Payless ShoeSource, and Jo-Ann Fabrics. An exit from Interstate 376 was built specifically to service the mall.

In 1986, Gold Circle became Kmart. Shortly thereafter, the foundation shifted, resulting a crack in the floor that ran the length of the store.  wide steel plates were used to cover it.

Zayre closed in 1989 along with three other stores in the area.

In 1990, David Weis closed, and its space would become a Phar-Mor a year later. Also in 1990, the former Zayre became a Kaufmann's clearance center.

By 1992, the clearance store was closed, and one-third of its space was converted to a CompUSA. The rest later became Syms Corporation.

In 1997, Thrift Drug became Eckerd when the latter bought out the chain.

In 1999, the arcade and food court were closed, with the latter later converted to a dance studio and a drivers' license office.

In 2002, Syms and Phar-Mor both closed. CompUSA moved to Robinson Town Centre.

By 2006, the center was largely vacant, with all tenants consolidated to the second floor after the first and third floors were closed to traffic. The mall building also had foundation issues that caused it to shake as the building settled on the fill dirt on which it was built. Some of the vibrations were caused by truck traffic passing by on the nearby Interstate.

Kmart announced its closure in late 2012, with its last day of operation on January 6, 2013. After this closure, the last remaining tenants were shuttered or relocated within the month, including GNC, a sports apparel store, a nail salon, a martial arts studio, and an optician.

In August 2016, the mall began to undergo demolition.

As of February 2019, the mall had been completely demolished except for the building housing Giant Eagle and formerly Kmart. Small hollow chunks of the mall still remained on the back and side of the building, covered by corrugated metal siding.

References

External links

Shopping malls in Metro Pittsburgh
Shopping malls established in 1982
Demolished shopping malls in the United States
Buildings and structures demolished in 2016
Demolished buildings and structures in Pittsburgh